Jenny Halpern Prince (née Halpern) is a British businesswoman.

Biography 

Prince was born in Kingston Upon Thames. She is the daughter of Sir Ralph Halpern and Lady (Joan) Halpern.

In 2014, she helped found the Lady Garden Foundation, a national women's health charity focusing on fighting gynaecological cancers.

Prince began her career as a PR Officer at Joseph, and founded Halpern PR in 1993. Halpern was one of the first agencies in London to create a specialist celebrity and influencer division. Halpern PR was part acquired by WPP in 2014 when Prince sold a percentage of the business to The&Partnership.

References 

Year of birth missing (living people)
Living people
People from Kingston upon Thames
Businesspeople from London